The Arizona woodrat (Neotoma devia) is a species of rodent in the family Cricetidae.
It is found in Mexico and United States.

References

Musser, G. G. and M. D. Carleton. 2005. Superfamily Muroidea. pp. 894–1531 in Mammal Species of the World a Taxonomic and Geographic Reference. D. E. Wilson and D. M. Reeder eds. Johns Hopkins University Press, Baltimore.

Neotoma
Mammals described in 1927
Taxonomy articles created by Polbot